Pio Ricci (1850 – August 21, 1919) was an Italian painter, mainly of genre and costume genre works.

Biography
He was born in Florence, where he studied at the Academy of Fine Arts. Among the works are a Ritratto dell'erede, exhibited at Turin in 1880; L' Applauso; La lezione di Musica; La Confidente; Gli Scorrucciati; L' Addio; L' Ora of the passeggiata; Non mi vuoi più bene?; Una visita agli sposini; Lezione di musica; Un secreto, and In campagna exhibited at the Promotrice of Florence. Also among his works: Cosa le dirò?; Regalo all' amante; Il regalo di un fiore; La prima dichiarazione d'amore; Aranti il tornèo; Sempre insieme; La lettera compromettente; Un rumore improvviso; Prima lezione di chitarra; and  L'onomastico of the padrona.

References

External links 
Athenaeum contains images of many of his works.

1850 births
1919 deaths
Italian costume genre painters
19th-century Italian painters
Italian male painters
20th-century Italian painters
Painters from Florence
Accademia di Belle Arti di Firenze alumni
19th-century Italian male artists
20th-century Italian male artists